John Fleming (fl. 1373–1386), of Rochester, Kent, was an English politician.

Early life
Nothing is known of Fleming's family or education.

Career
Fleming was a Member of Parliament for the constituency of Rochester, Kent in 1373 and 1386.

References

14th-century births
Year of death missing
English MPs 1373
People from Rochester, Kent
English MPs 1386